Sam Battersea (born May 1974) is an English actress. She is part of the trio who were commissioned by BBC Three to write and perform their own narrative comedy show called Live!Girls! present Dogtown in 1996. From 2016 to 2017, she starred in the CBBC series Class Dismissed. Since 2018, Battersea has appeared on a recurring basis on the BBC soap opera Doctors as Su Turtle.

Filmography

References

External links
 
 

1974 births
Living people
English soap opera actresses
English television actresses
actors from Reading, Berkshire